Lilie Chouliaraki is a professor in Media and Communications at the London School of Economics and Political Sciences (LSE). Chouliaraki’s main area of research is the mediation of human vulnerability and suffering. She empirically explores how the media affects our moral and political relationships with distant others in the sense that it affects how we see the vulnerability of other people and how we are asked to feel, think and act toward them.

Her approach is interdisciplinary and draws on Social and Cultural Theory, Moral Philosophy and Sociology, Visual Communication and Social Semiotics, as well as Discourse Theory and Analysis.

Mediation of Suffering
Chouliaraki’s research focuses on five domains in which suffering appears as an ethical problem of communication: war and conflict reporting, disaster news, humanitarian campaigns and celebrity advocacy, migration and victimhood. She investigates these domains across both mass media and digital media.

War and Conflict Reporting 
In The aestheticization of suffering on television, Chouliaraki analyzes war footage to identify how television's strategies of mediation deal with the tension between reporting war as ‘objective’ news and a time of intense human suffering. Chouliaraki argues that the bombardment of Baghdad in 2003 during the Iraq war was filmed in long-shot and presented in a quasi literary narrative that capitalized on an aesthetics of horror, on sublime spectacle  (Boltanski). She claims that the "aestheticization of suffering on television is thus produced by a visual and linguistic complex that eliminates the human pain aspect of suffering, whilst retaining the phantasmagoric effects of a tableau vivant", producing an "aestheticization of suffering [that] manages simultaneously to preserve an aura of objectivity and impartiality, and to take a pro-war side in the war footage".

Chouliaraki's research on war reporting looks at mobile phone footage from post-Arab Spring conflict zones, exploring how major news platforms accommodate Twitter, amateur videos and other genres, such as selfies, in their news stories. Her argument is that war journalism has shifted from reporting, that is providing information on the development of military operations, to witnessing, shifting the focus to civilian suffering and death. Chouliaraki's current work includes a study of how people see war on their smartphones or social media.

Disaster News 
In The Spectatorship of Suffering, Chouliaraki explores the relationship between people in the West who watch TV and the distant person who is suffering on the screen.  Chouliaraki shows how Western national and trans-national television networks covering disaster news follow hierarchical patterns in how they tell stories about the suffering of people far away and, by extension, how they spread moral feelings about people far away. She came to the conclusion that when they do this, they create global hierarchies of places and people along a West/non-West axis.

According to Chouliaraki, the first example of disaster reporting was the live blogging of the Haiti earthquake in 2010. In this context, convergent news has changed the rules of reporting in favor of more inclusive and pluralist authored news production. Instead of relying on the live immediacy of TV footage arranged by the expert witness of the reporter, major convergent platforms like the BBC use nonprofessional witnesses whose real-time messages (Tweets, emails and mobile phone footage) are amalgamated online in a timeframe of cable-like updates. These storylines are defined by their broken textuality, made up of a timeline of short texts and links that have nothing to do with one another. They are also characterized by their decentralized voice, which makes NGOs and regular people the most important source of news.

Humanitarian campaigns and celebrity advocacy 
Chouliaraki has also conducted research on humanitarian and human rights communication, looking at how the way solidarity has been communicated has changed over the past fifty years. In The Ironic Spectator, Chouliaraki examines the performance of solidarity with vulnerable individuals in our media world. She contends that narratives in which starvation is conveyed via our personal experience of dieting, or in which solidarity with Africa translates into wearing a stylish armband, tell us far more than the intended message. These narratives reveal something about how we envision the world outside of ourselves.

Looking at how Amnesty International and Oxfam campaigns, such as the Live Aid and Live 8 concerts and the work of Audrey Hepburn and Angelina Jolie, and the BBC report on earthquakes show how solidarity is no longer about conviction but about choice, no longer about vision but about lifestyle, and no longer about others but about ourselves, making us ironic spectators of other people's pain.

Developing a moral reflection on the mediation of solidarity, Chouliaraki asks how we relate to images on TV of people suffering far away. This question is central to her work because it guides how the media should act morally in public life today. The answer to the question raises two major dilemmas: 1) if the media can teach people to care about and get involved with people far away; 2) if the media can develop a global public with a sense of social obligation toward people far away who are suffering.

Migration 
Chouliaraki's work has recently turned to the way people talk about migration. Together with Myria Georgiou, she uses multi-method research on the largest migration event of the 21st century in the West—the 2015 migration crisis and its aftermath leading up to 2020—to explain the complexity and contradictions of the border in the age of datafication. This collaboration has led to the publication of the book The Digital Border: Migration, Technology, Power in 2022.

This two-year research project, co-led by Chouliaraki, focused on the 2015 migration crisis in Europe and provided an integrated overview of its digital mediations in press and on the ground. The project focuses both on online news headlines in eight European countries in the period July–December 2015; and on the use of digital media on the ground, in one of the Greek border islands, where migrants first arrived. In this double focus, the project is the first one to approach the mediation of the migration crisis in terms of both its narrative border (content analysis of online press in terms of headline language and images) and its territorial border (participant observation  on Chios island that maps out the actors and uses of social media and other digital equipment for purposes on migrant reception).

Chouliaraki and Georgiou develop a holistic theory of digital borders as an assembly of technological infrastructures (from surveillance cameras to smartphones) and media imaginaries (stories, images, and social media posts) to tell the story of migration as it happens in Europe's outer islands as well as its most vibrant cities. The two authors describe  the digital border as neither fully digital nor fully in control. It is both digital and pre-digital, data-field and physical, automated and self-reflective, and made up of fragile social relationships that include both despair or inhumanity and the promise of a better future.

Victimhood and Vulnerability 
Chouliaraki is also working on a critical study of the idea of victimhood and how it is currently used in the cultural politics of western public spheres. In this field of research she is interested in the historical and present conditions under which vulnerability, a social condition of being open to violence, turns into victimhood, a way of communicating that gives everyone who claims it the moral value of the vulnerable.

Chouliaraki proposes an analytical distinction between "tactical" and "systemic" vulnerability as a way to think about the implication of victimhood. This distinction gives us a way to ask questions about who claims to be a victim, from what position, and to what effect. It also helps us look at the social circumstances in which affective claims to victimhood are made, as well as the power dynamics these claims reproduce or challenge.

Analytics of Mediation 
Chouliaraki notably applies interpretive methodologies in social research, meaning she studies and problematizes representations not via normative argumentation but through the investigation of separate instances. She endorses an analysis of mediation as a method for the study of representations that views it as both a semiotic achievement (as a text) and a technology rooted inside existing power relations. In this way, the analytics of mediation aims to preserve the modernist heritage of social criticism and change, and to support the mission of a critical interpretation. Therefore, Chouliaraki situates the analytics of mediation as a form of critical social research in relation to diverse perspectives from the philosophy of science to social theory and from political science to sociology and linguistics.

Discourse, visual and multi-modal analysis are important methods of investigation in Chouliaraki's work. In Discourse in Late Modernity written with Norman Fairclough, she demonstrates that Critical Discourse Analysis (CDA) is well-suited to empirical research and theory-building throughout the social sciences, especially research and theory on the semiotic/linguistic components of the social world. Discourse is neither code nor structure but practice, an inherent dimension of social action in the world.  Further work of Chouliaraki explores discourse as practice through a discussion of three different versions of constructivist epistemologies and discusses how  we can research the social world when we do not believe in 'objective' reality.

Career 
Chouliaraki received her bachelor's degree in philosophy at the University of Athens, and both her MA and PhD in Linguistics from Lancaster University.

Chouliaraki joined Copenhagen Business School (CBS) in 2004, and in 2006, she became Professor of Media and Discourse Studies. Chouliaraki joined London School of Economics (LSE) a year later, in 2007, as Professor in Media and Communication.

Chouliaraki's work has been funded by the Greek, Danish, Nordic and Dutch Research Councils. She is the recipient of three international awards for her publications, most recently the Outstanding Article award from the Journalism Studies Division of the International Communication Association (2014), and the Outstanding Book of the Year award from the International Communication Association (2015) for The Ironic Spectator.

In 2014, in Media Ethics & Humanitarianism, Chouliaraki discussed 'the moral implications of the use of celebrities by humanitarian organisations' in the YouTube video debates ‘Gearty Grilling’ with Prof. Conor Gearty.

She is currently board member of the journals Discourse and Society; Visual Communication; Social Semiotics; Critical Discourse Studies; Crime, Media, Culture; Journal of Language and Politics, JOMEC Journal, Popular Communication, Digital Journalism. She was also a judge at The Guardian’s International Development Competition, 2012 and 2013.

Chouliaraki has lectured for major NGOs, such as Amnesty International (UK, Finland) and Doctors without Borders (Germany) on the development of their communication agendas and strategies.

Honors and awards 
 Nominated for Walter Benjamin Outstanding Article Award in the Field of Media Ecology of the Media Ecology Association, New York 2017. Victimhood, voice and power in digital media Simonsen K.M. and Kjaergaard J. R. (eds)  Discursive Framings of Human rights: Negotiating Agency and Victimhood Abingdon: Routledge pp. 247–62.
 Outstanding Book of the Year Award, International Communication Association, 2015. 'The Ironic Spectator:  Solidarity in the Age of Post-humanitarianism: Solidarity in the Age of Post-humanitarianism' (2013) Polity Press, Cambridge.
 Outstanding Paper of the Year Award, Journalism Studies Division,  International Communication Association, 2014. Re-mediation, inter-mediation, trans-mediation (2012) Journalism Studies, 14 (2) pp. 267–283.
 Top Paper of the Year Award, Journalism Studies Division, International Communication Association, 2010. Ordinary witnessing in post-television news: towards a new moral imagination (2010) Critical Discourse Studies, 7 (4) pp. 305–319.

Publications 
Her publications include Discourse in Late Modernity (1999), The Spectatorship of Suffering (2006), The Soft Power of War (2008), Media, Organizations, Identity (2009), Self-mediation. New Media, Citizenship and Civic Selves (2012) and The Ironic Spectator: Solidarity in the Age of Post-humanitarianism (2013) and The Digital Border: Migration, Technology, Power (2022). In addition, she has published more than sixty articles in peer-reviewed journals and edited volumes.  Her work is widely cited and has been published in French, Italian, Portuguese, Polish, Danish, Greek and Chinese.

Books 
 The Digital Border: Migration, Technology, Power (2022) 
 The Ironic Spectator: Solidarity in the Age of Post-humanitarianism (2013) 
 Self-Mediation. New Media, Citizenship and Civil Selves (2012), 
 Media Organizations, Identity (2009, with Mette Morsing), 
 The Soft Power of War (2008), 
 The Spectatorship of Suffering (2006), 
 Discourse in Late Modernity (1999, with Norman Fairclough),

Selected articles 
 Chouliaraki Lilie (2017) Symbolic Bordering: The self-representation of refugees in digital news. Popular Communication 15 (2): 78-94.
 Chouliaraki Lilie and Georgiou Myria (2016) Hospitability: The Communicative Architecture of Humanitarian Securitization at Europe's Borders Journal of Communication 67(2): 159–180.
 Chouliaraki, Lilie (2013) Re-mediation, inter-mediation, trans-mediation. Journalism Studies, 14 (2). pp. 267–283
 Chouliaraki, Lilie (2013) Mediating vulnerability: cosmopolitanism and the public sphere. Media, Culture and Society, 35 (1). pp. 105–112.
 Chouliaraki, Lilie (2010) Post-humanitarianism: humanitarian communication beyond a politics of pity. International journal of cultural studies, 13 (2). pp. 107–126.
 Chouliaraki Lilie and Fairclough Norman (2010) Critical Discourse Analysis in Organizational Studies: Towards an integrationist methodology. Journal of Management Studies 47 (6): 1213–1218.
 Chouliaraki, Lilie (2010) Ordinary witnessing in post-television news: towards a new moral imagination. Critical Discourse Studies, 7 (4). pp. 305–319. 
 Chouliaraki, Lilie (2008) The Mediation of suffering and the vision of a cosmopolitan public. Television & new media, 9 (5). pp. 371–391. ISSN 1552-8316 
 Chouliaraki, Lilie (2006) Aestheticization of suffering on television. Visual Communication, 5 (3). pp. 261–285. 
 Chouliaraki, Lilie (2004) Watching 11 September: the politics of pity. Discourse & Society, 15 (2-3). pp. 185–198.

Selected reviews
 "This book achieves a rare combination of opening new analytical and theoretical ground while retaining direct and lucid engagement with critical and urgent human concerns." The British Journal of Sociology
 "The Ironic Spectator, therefore, is not only an eminent work of media studies scholarship that presents a detailed and inspiring analytical framework. Its theorization of post-humanitarianism and the aesthetic and sociopolitical questions posed by new media practices deserves to earn it a wide readership in all disciplines interested in contemporary popular culture and world politics." European Journal of Communication
 "The significance of The Ironic Spectator for students and scholars of contemporary media, international relations, "development", and the broader social sciences, and, ideally, people working within media, for NGOs and INGOs, and the wider humanitarian and development sectors, cannot be overstated." Social Semiotics
 "Chouliaraki conducts an impressive, interdisciplinary analysis. She embraces the paradoxes and ambivalences of each genre, presenting a state of the art critique, and thoroughly analysing the genre's past and present form in order to suggest how the changes in communicative structure may affect how we are invited to act on distant others." The Journal of Development Studies
 "Chouliaraki qualifies as a high priestess of the representation of suffering and how we engage with distant others. She dissects with great clarity exactly what is taking place in this post humanitarian sensibility and how supporters are now being drawn in to apparently care and show solidarity with distant sufferers." LSE Review of Books
 "As refreshing and enervating as a cold mountain spring on a hot day. Chouliaraki has extraordinary ability to condense and parse complex debates briskly." Journal of International Development
 "The Spectatorship of Suffering, by Lilie Chouliaraki, rapidly became a classic, present on almost every key and suggested reading list on courses dealing with global media and international journalism… Therefore, The Ironic Spectator is a more than welcome contribution to this field, offering an opportunity to discuss one of the most pressing issues in media and journalism studies. In this book, she deals with the issue of humanitarian communication, offering a comprehensive set of arguments which makes us think truly out of the box." Digital Journalism
 "Lilie Chouliaraki's The Ironic Spectator is the best journalism book for 2013." Tweet by Prof. Bob Franklin, Cardiff University; editor of Journalism Studies

References 

Living people
Academics of the London School of Economics
Year of birth missing (living people)
People from Komotini
Alumni of Lancaster University
Greek academics
National and Kapodistrian University of Athens alumni